A Girl & Three Sweethearts, known as  in Japan, is a 2016 Japanese television drama, starring Mirei Kiritani, Kento Yamazaki, Shohei Miura and Shūhei Nomura. It aired on every Monday at 21:00 (JST) on Fuji Television beginning July 11, 2016 and ending on September 19, 2016.

Cast 
 Mirei Kiritani as Misaki Sakurai	
 A hardworking patissier who just got laid off, she bumps into her old crush Chiaki Shibasaki and ends up working for his family restaurant Sea Sons while moving in with him and his two brothers.
 Kento Yamazaki as Kanata Shibasaki	
 The second Shibasaki brother, head chef of Sea Sons. He is very stoic, but his culinary skills are well known. His half-sister is Manami Nishijima.
 Shohei Miura as Chiaki Shibasaki
 The eldest Shibasaki brother and Misaki's old crush. He owns and operates several restaurants including Sea Sons, the restaurant passed down to him and his brothers from his father after he died. He used to date Kaede Takatsuki, but they broke up after she moved away to study abroad in Boston. He hides many secrets in hopes to protect his family.
 Shūhei Nomura as Touma Shibasaki
 The youngest Shibasaki brother, a free spirit and womanizer. He quits culinary school without telling his brothers and questions what to do with his life.
 Sakurako Ohara as Manami Nishijima
 Kanata's half-sister. Her mother is suffering from a rare disease.
 Kenta Hamano as Nobuyuki Himura
 Chiaki's good friend from college.
 Hinako Sano as Mikako Okuda
 Nobuyuki's girlfriend.
 Marie Iitoyo as Fuka Ninomiya	
 Touma's girlfriend. She is concerned about Touma's welfare.
 Nanao as Kaede Takatsuki	
 Chiaki's ex-girlfriend and aspiring pianist. She has a complicated past she hides from Chiaki so he won't get hurt, but still loves him.
 Kōtarō Yoshida as Ryo Higashimura
 Head of a major restaurant chain, he wants to take over Sea Sons from the Shibasaki brothers and he's not afraid of using nefarious means to do so.

Episodes

Remark 
 Episode 7 was not aired on Monday, August 22, 2016, due to broadcast of the 2016 Summer Olympics in Rio de Janeiro, Brazil (7:00 p.m. to 9:54 p.m. Japan consortium program). This episode was scheduled to be aired on Monday August 29, 2016

International broadcast 
In Indonesia, Myanmar, Singapore, Thailand, Sri Lanka, Vietnam and Mongolia, the drama is broadcast on WakuWaku Japan with a variety of subtitles under the title, A Girl and Three Sweethearts.

References

External links
  
 

2016 in Japanese television
Japanese drama television series
2016 Japanese television series debuts
2016 Japanese television series endings
Fuji TV dramas
Japanese romantic comedy television series